Autassassinophilia is a paraphilia in which a person is sexually aroused by the risk of being killed. The fetish may overlap with some other fetishes that risk one's life, such as those involving drowning or choking. This does not necessarily mean the person must actually be in a life-threatening situation, for many are aroused from dreams and fantasies of such.

Description 

The term was introduced by John Money who also defined erotophonophilia as the "reciprocal condition" in which one is aroused by "stage-managing and carrying out the murder of an unsuspecting sexual partner". Money classified both these paraphilias as "of the sacrificial/expiatory type".

Criticism of the concept 
These concepts, especially their imperfect reciprocity, were criticized by Lisa Downing, who wrote that: 
The autassassinophiliac, for Money, is more interested in his orgasm than in his death, resulting in a compulsion to stage manage the possibility rather than the actuality of his end at the hands of another person. The erotophonophiliac, on the other hand, is driven by the actualization of the other's death and – crucially – this other must be unaware of the would-be killer's intentions. These definitions, then, effectively preclude reciprocity and are constructed here in such a way as to prevent the possibility of consent. The sexologist, it seems, is incapable of imagining mutuality in this context. ... The imagined pact is used here as an incentive to the would-be libertarian to support the suppression of paraphilia and the conversion of a death-related desire to a life-giving form.

See also 
 Killing of Sharon Lopatka

References

Bibliography and external links

 Rudy Flora, "How to work with sex offenders: a handbook for criminal justice, human service, and mental health professionals", Routledge, 2001, p. 90

 

Sexual fetishism
Paraphilias